{{Automatic taxobox
| fossil_range = 
| image = Wolf-like canids.jpg
| image_caption = 
| display_parents = 3
| taxon = Canina
| authority = Fischer de Waldheim, 1817
| subdivision_ranks = Genera
| subdivision_ref = 
| subdivision = * Canis
 †Xenocyon
 Cuon
 Lupulella
 Lycaon †Cynotherium †Eucyon †Aenocyon}}

Canina is a taxonomic rank which represents the wolf-like sub-tribe of the tribe Canini, and is sister to the sub-tribe Cerdocyonina. Fossils of this group date to 5 million years ago, however they are likely to have been in existence 9 million years ago. Its members as a group are colloquially known as the wolf-like canids.

Taxonomy

Members of the subtribe Canina are able to produce canid hybrids due to their shared karyotype of 78 chromosomes arranged in 39 pairs.

The cladogram below is based on the phylogeny of Lindblad-Toh et al. (2005), modified to incorporate recent findings on Canis'' species.

References

 
Animal subtribes
Canines